Ancylorhynchus is a genus of flies belonging to the family Asilidae.

The species of this genus are found in Africa.

Species

Species:

Ancylorhynchus argyroaster 
Ancylorhynchus bicolor 
Ancylorhynchus braunsi

References

Asilidae